Norshahrul Idlan bin Talaha (born 8 June 1986), also known as Mat Yo, is a Malaysian professional footballer who plays as a forward for Malaysia Super League side Sabah. From 2007 to 2021, he represented the Malaysia national team. He popularly known as Mat Yo by Malaysian football fans.

Career

Perak
Norshahrul was born in Besut, Terengganu. He moved to Perak when he was 1 months old. He attended a local school and started playing for the Perak at the age of 12. Then, he promoted to play for the Perak senior team in 2003. He was mostly a substitute for Perak and sometimes play for the reserve team.

UPB-MyTeam
He later signed by the newly created club, UPB-MyTeam FC. He was one of the team's key players and score 16 goals in all competition for the club.

Kelantan
Norshahrul join Kelatan in late 2009. He was part of the Kelantan's 2010 Malaysia Cup winning team. Norshahrul won two awards at the 2010 Anugerah Bola Sepak Kebangsaan 100Plus-FAM as the Best Forward and Most Valuable Player.

Johor Darul Ta'zim
After spending three years in Kota Bharu, Norshahrul left the Kelantanese outfit to join Johor Darul Ta'zim  (JDT) for an undisclosed fee. On 8 January 2013, he made his debut and scored his first goal for the club in a 3–2 defeat to Pahang. In the same season, JDT qualify for the final of the Malaysia Cup where he missed a penalty.

Armed Forces
Norshahrul joined ATM FA for the 2015 season, after leaving Johor Darul Takzim FC at the conclusion of his contract at the end of 2014. He was reunited with his former coach back when he was in Kelantan, B. Sathianathan.

Terengganu
After only 3 months with ATM FA, he signed with Terengganu for the remaining of 2015 Malaysia Super League season.

Felda United
Norshahrul signed with Felda United after spending two years with Terengganu. He scored his first goal a 1-0 victory against PKNS. He then went on to score his second goal against league leaders and former club Johor Darul Ta'zim in a 3-1 defeat.

Pahang
After a disappointing spell with Felda United, he went on to sign with Malaysian Super League runners up Pahang.

BG Pathum United
After released by Pahang, he signed a one-year contract with BG Pathum United for 2020 Thai League 1 season. With BG Pathum, he created history by becoming the first Malaysian professional footballer to won a first division league title in Thailand.

International career
Norshahrul has played for the Malaysia national youth team for 2004 AFC Youth Championship. He scored in a 3-0 win against Nepal during the tournament as Malaysia made it to the quarter finals. He is also one of the Malaysia under 23 players that won the 2007 Merdeka Tournament. He made his full international debut against Bahrain on 28 October 2007 after coming in for Sumardi Hajalan.

On 12 July 2009, Norshahrul scored his first senior international goals in an unofficial match against Zimbabwe. He later score his first full international goal against Lesotho on 11 September 2009.

In November 2010, Norshahrul was called up to the Malaysia national squad by coach K. Rajagopal for the 2010 AFF Suzuki Cup. Norshahrul scored 2 goals for Malaysia that time, one was a 5–1 loss against Indonesia and a 5–1 victory against Laos. Malaysia won the 2010 AFF Suzuki Cup title for the first time in their history.

On 9 December 2012, he scored a goal for Malaysia against Thailand in 2012 AFF Suzuki Cup, as Malaysia failed to retain the title having lost to Thailand on aggregate in the semi-finals.

Norshahrul was again included by new coach Dollah Salleh for the 2014 AFF Suzuki Cup squad, and played in all of Malaysia games as Malaysia advanced into the finals, only to be denied of the title by Thailand. Norshahrul scored one goal in the tournament, against Vietnam in the semi-final second leg.

Career statistics

Club

International 
</ref>

Appearances in major competitions

International goals
Scores and results list Malaysia's goal tally first.

1 FIFA revoked the ‘A’ international classification for the matches once it was discovered that a Zimbabwean club team, Monomotapa United impersonated as the Zimbabwe national team and were not approved by the Zimbabwe Football Association.

U-23 team

Appearances in major competitions

Honours

Club

Kelantan FA
 Malaysia Super League (2) : 2011, 2012
 Malaysia FA Cup : 2012
 Malaysia Cup (2): 2010, 2012
 Sultan Haji Ahmad Shah Cup: Winners (1): 2011

Johor Darul Takzim
 2014 Malaysia Super League : Winner
 2014 Malaysia Cup : Runner Up
 2013 Malaysia FA Cup : Runner Up

Pahang FA
 2018 Malaysia FA Cup : Winner

BG Pathum United
 2020–21 Thai League 1 : Winner

International
 2007 Merdeka Tournament: Winner
 2009 SEA Games: Gold
 2010 AFF Suzuki Cup: Winner
 2014 AFF Suzuki Cup: Runner Up
 2018 AFF Suzuki Cup: Runner Up

Individual
 2010 Anugerah Bola Sepak Kebangsaan 100Plus-FAM: the Best Forward and Most Valuable Player
 2011 Anugerah Bola Sepak Kebangsaan 100Plus-FAM: the Best Forward and Most Valuable Player
 2012 Anugerah Bola Sepak Kebangsaan 100Plus-FAM: the Best Forward and Most Valuable Player
Goal.com's monthly Asian Best XI (Subs): January 2012
2018 AFF Championship: Best Eleven
 ASEAN Football Federation Best XI: 2019

References

External links
 
 Norshahrul Idlan Talaha's Profile at F.A.M. website

1986 births
Living people
Malaysian footballers
Malaysia international footballers
People from Terengganu
People from Perak
Kelantan FA players
Perak F.C. players
Negeri Sembilan FA players
UPB-MyTeam FC players
Johor Darul Ta'zim F.C. players
ATM FA players
Sarawak United FC players
Norshahrul Idlan
Norshahrul Idlan
Malaysian people of Malay descent
Malaysia Super League players
Malaysia Premier League players
Association football forwards
Association football midfielders
Footballers at the 2006 Asian Games
Footballers at the 2010 Asian Games
Southeast Asian Games gold medalists for Malaysia
Southeast Asian Games medalists in football
Competitors at the 2009 Southeast Asian Games
Asian Games competitors for Malaysia
Malaysian expatriate sportspeople in Thailand